The Cheese Board Collective in Berkeley, California, comprises two worker-owned-and-operated businesses: a cheese shop/bakery commonly referred to as "The Cheese Board", and a pizzeria known as "Cheese Board Pizza". Along with Peet's Coffee, the Cheese Board is known for its role in starting the North Shattuck neighborhood of Berkeley on its way to becoming famous as a culinary destination: the "Gourmet Ghetto".  The bakery brought the French baguette into vogue for Berkeley consumers, and helped spark a revolution in artisan bread.

The Cheese Board is located at 1504 Shattuck Avenue and Cheese Board Pizza is located two doors down the street at 1512 Shattuck Avenue. In 2003, the Cheese Board Collective put together a cookbook, The Cheese Board: Collective Works.

History

Founding and collectivization 
The Cheese Board was founded as a privately owned cheese shop in 1967 by Elizabeth Magarian Valoma (1930–2021) and Sahag Avedisian (1930–2007) at a small commercial space at 2114 Vine Street in Berkeley, CA. In 1971, the owners converted their business from a conventional privately owned firm to an egalitarian worker-owned collective by distributing shares in the business equally between themselves and their six employees and equalizing the wages of all of the new worker/owners. The semi-autonomous pizza operation was started in 1990. The combined operation currently has over 55 workers.

Bread 
When founded, the shop primarily sold cheese, but by 1975, the Cheese Board began to experiment with baking bread. Bread was originally produced in small quantities as an informal, impromptu sideline. Although bread sales were initially minor they marked a shift from a purely mercantile business model of buying and selling cheese to a mixed model that combines on-site, artisanal hand-production with domestic and import retail. The sale of baked goods grew rapidly, the baguette in particular. The Cheese Board popularized the baguette for U.S. customers. Bread now accounts for a significant portion of the store's business. As the sale of bakery products grew so did the variety of breads, pastries and other baked goods offered. The Cheese Board: Collective Works reports that, "The varying bread schedule is complex enough that even the workers have difficulty remembering it."

Pizza 

In 1990, a second semi-independent operation (which the members call an empowered committee), Cheese Board Pizza, was formed to produce pizza (originally sold as an occasional lunch and Friday night offering by the Cheese Board bakery) full-time. Cheese Board Pizza is unusual in that only one type of pizza (always vegetarian) is made each day and no substitutions are allowed. Because the same product is continually being produced, customers always receive their pizza fresh from the oven without pre-ordering. Once a new pizza is ready, any remaining slices from the previous pizza are cut into slivers and given out as lagniappes. The Cheese Board staff tend to favor unconventional pizza toppings and use only fresh, seasonal produce. In 2007, Cheese Board Pizza renovated their shop and expanded into the space at 1512 Shattuck formerly occupied by University Plumbing and Hardware. The enlarged dining area seats significantly more people and allows faster service. The restaurant still has a piano and reserves floor space for the small jazz groups that often perform during peak hours. They often have special pizzas to celebrate occasions such as Bastille Day and Indian Independence Day.

The Cheese Board and the "Gourmet Ghetto" 
The Cheese Board was one of the first gourmet establishments in north Berkeley (along with Peet's Coffee) and its success contributed greatly to the development of the area into the "Gourmet Ghetto" it has become. Alice Waters, the founder of Chez Panisse—one of the most famous restaurants in the United States—stated that she chose to locate her restaurant in North Berkeley "so the Cheese Board would be nearby, because I knew I would be among friends".

Contribution to the Cooperative Movement 
The Cheese Board has helped launch other cooperatives throughout its history. In 1971 it bid and won the contract to operate the Swallow Collective Cafe in the Berkeley Art Museum, an entity initially staffed by Cheese Board members but eventually became its own cooperative business with as many as 30 members. In 1975 it funded and launched the Juice Bar Collective before similarly spinning off this operation. In 1976 the Cheese Board helped a member begin a cheese store on Donner Pass.<ref>Collective Directory Group. The Cheeseboard.  Bay Area Directory of Collectives. 1980.</ref> In the 1980s, the Cheese Board contributed money and labor to a Bay Area cooperative network known as the Intercollective, a precursor to the present-day Network of Bay Area Worker Cooperatives. Through the Intercollective it funded the printing of a directory, map, and essays about local collectives, as well as a 1981 conference.

In the mid-1990s, after creating the Cheese Board Pizza, the collective continued its pattern of incubating new businesses, rather than expanding, by helping to create the Arizmendi Association of Cooperatives. This Association has replicated and refined three bakeries using the Cheese Board's recipes and organizational structure (in Oakland (1997), San Francisco (2000 and 2010), Emeryville (2003), and San Rafael (2010)). All six collectives are independently owned and operated, but share a technical support staff who provide financial, legal, and organizational services, and who are paid to continue replicating the model. All of the Arizmendi Bakeries have won "Best Bakery" award in local newspapers during their lifetime.

The Cheese Board is an active member of NoBAWC, San Francisco's worker collective network and the United States Federation of Worker Cooperatives.

 Notes 

 References 
 The Cheese Board Collective website describes the history of the Cheese Board, lists the bakery offerings and provides directions to the shop.
 The Cheese Board Collective published The Cheese Board: Collective Works: Bread, Pastry, Cheese, Pizza that describes the history of the business and includes many recipes. The above quote from Alice Waters was taken from the foreword to this book.
 An article from the San Francisco Chronicle about the Cheese Board: Sweet Profits: Co-op bakeries raise the dough
 
 "Cheese Board" in Bay Area Directory of Collectives: Listings, Map, and Articles'', New Moon Press, 1980.

External links 
The official Cheese Board website
Cheeseboard's sourdough starter
An overlook of The Cheese Board Collective by The San Francisco Chronicle (2003)

Companies based in Berkeley, California
Worker cooperatives of the United States
Pizzerias in the United States
Restaurants in Berkeley, California
Restaurants established in 1967
Cooperatives in the San Francisco Bay Area
Food and drink in the San Francisco Bay Area
1967 establishments in California